Human analog missions are activities undertaken on Earth in various environments to simulate aspects of human missions to other worlds, including the Moon, asteroids, and Mars.  These remote field tests are performed in locations that are identified based on their physical similarities to the extreme space environments of a target mission.  Such activities are undertaken to test hardware and operational concepts in relevant environments.

Obviously no analog can simulate all aspects of a human space mission here on Earth.  That is why a wide array of analog activities are necessary, each testing only a few important concepts and/or hardware elements at a time.

Analog activities

 Construction of a Habitat Inside a Lunar-analogue Lava tube - ICEE Space, Iceland (CHILL-ICE): One of a kind lava tube mission where selected analog astronauts build a habitat in Icelandic lava tubes and perform scientific experiments to explore In-Situ Resource Utilization (ISRU). Past research includes rover robustness to rough terrain, analog astronaut's physical and mental performance under high pressure and in extreme environments as well as lava tube communications.
 Desert Research and Technology Studies (D-RATS) – This NASA-funded program tests hardware, such as rover prototypes, and operations concepts, like sample-collection techniques, in the Arizona desert every fall.
 Pavilion Lake Research Project (PLRP) – This is a joint project between the Canadian Space Agency and NASA which conducts research on Pavilion Lake and others in British Columbia, Canada to explain the origin of freshwater microbialites, as well as to test operational concepts for deep space missions. While the lake is not a close physical analog to the Moon or Mars or an asteroid, the complex operations of the field team and back room in dealing with communications, power, safety, science, etc., make the project an excellent operational analog.
 NASA Extreme Environment Mission Operations (NEEMO) – This NASA-funded program utilizes the Aquarius habitat, owned by NOAA and operated by the University of North Carolina Wilmington, to simulate operations in a challenging low-gravity environment.  Groups of "aquanauts" live in Aquarius for up to three weeks at a time, performing EVAs around the habitat and the nearby coral reef.
 Arctic Mars Analog Svalbard Expedition (AMASE) – This NASA-funded annual expedition uses various field sites on the Svalbard archipelago (Norway) because these sites are thought to be analogous to sites on ancient Mars.  These sites provide an excellent opportunity to test hardware and instruments to assist in detection and characterization of low levels of microbiota and organic and mineralogical biomarkers.
 Mars Analogue Research Station Program (MARS) – This project, run by the Mars Society, includes stations at Devon Island in the Arctic (FMARS) (see also HMP) and Southern Utah (MDRS).  Multinational teams live and work at the stations for two to four weeks conducting simulated missions and science experiments, testing hardware and operational concepts.
 Haughton Mars Project (HMP) – This project on Devon Island in the Arctic is run jointly by SETI and the Mars Society. The project utilizes the Mars-like features of the Island and the impact crater to develop and test new technologies and field operating procedures, and to study the human dynamics which result from extended contact in close quarters.
 Mars-500 – This analog, located at the Russian Academy of Sciences Institute of Biomedical Problems (IBMP) in Moscow, Russia, placed a multinational crew of six into a spacecraft mock-up for a 520-day simulated mission to Mars.  Their goal was to understand the psychological implications of long duration spaceflight.
 PolAres – This interdisciplinary research programme by the Austrian Space Forum has undertaken a number of Mars analog missions and has conducted a multi-national field simulation in the Sahara desert near Erfoud in Morocco in February 2013.
 Project Moonwalk ("MOONWALK") – This project is funded by the European Commission under the “space activity” theme of the 7th Framework Programme is to develop and test technologies for astronaut-robot cooperation applied to Extra-Vehicular Activities (EVA) on planetary surfaces and training procedures for future human missions to Moon and Mars.
 Cooperative Adventure for Valuing and Exercising human behaviour and performance Skills (ESA-CAVES), is a European Space Agency astronaut training course in which international astronauts train in a space-analogue cave environment.
Desert Mars Analog Ramon Station (D-MARS) - Is an analogue mission to mars, taking place in Makhtesh Ramon (-Ramon crater) located in the Israel's Negev desert. Ramon's geological features bear similarity to the soil condition of Mars's soil. In addition, the mission takes place in the crater because of its relative abundance. Several missions have been carried out since the beginning of 2018, each staffed by six Ramonauts (what crew members are called). They have accomplished many experiments in many disciplines, including physics, soil studies, microbial studies, psychology, agriculture, water supply, and engineering. Between 15Oct-15Nov2020, the Austrian Space Forum – in cooperation with the Israel Space Agency as the host agency and D-MARS – will conduct an integrated Mars analog field mission in the Negev Desert in Israel - the AMADEE-20 Mars simulation. The expedition will be carried out in a Martian terrestrial analog and directed by a dedicated Mission Support Center in Austria. A small field crew of highly trained analog astronauts with spacesuit simulators will conduct experiments preparing for future human and robotic Mars exploration missions.
 LunAres Research Station - an analogue research station for crewed space mission simulation, located at the post-military airport in Poland, open for scientists and researchers. The station can hold a Lunar and Martian 2 weeks mission for a 6-person crew, providing space and infrastructure for complex research on the impact of long-term extra-terrestrial human presence. The base is fully isolated from the environment including 250 square meters of EVA area.
 Inflatable Lunar-Mars Analog Habitat (ILMAH) – This NASA-funded program utilizes the Inflatable Lunar-Mars Analog Habitat, owned and operated by the University of North Dakota's Human Spaceflight Laboratory, to simulate and develop human in the loop systems to be used for planetary space exploration.
Asclepios – A student-led analogue space mission program originating from students of the École Polytechnique Fédérale de Lausanne focusing on short-term scientific missions organized in Switzerland. Its first mission, Asclepios I, took place between 12th-20th of July 2021 in the caves of the Grimsel Test Site.
Habitat Marte - a permanent analog station in a semiarid region of Brazil, 120 km west of Natal. Habitat Marte consists of one brick-and-mortar station with a greenhouse for hydroponics and aquaponics research, as well as an auditorium for education events. The station is the only one in the world featuring a swimming pool for underwater EVAs. Habitat Marte conducts monthly analog missions and is open for applicants around the world.

References

External links 
 ICEE Space lunar lava tube analog missions website
 NASA analog missions website
 NASA Desert RATS website
 Pavilion Lake Research Project website
 NASA NEEMO website
 Aquarius undersea research station website
 Mars Analogue Research Station Program
 Haughton Mars Project website
 Mars-500 Project website
 Project MOONWALK website
 ESA CAVES website
Asclepios website
Habitat Marte website

 
Space policy